The Call is a 2013 American psychological crime thriller film directed by Brad Anderson and written by Richard D'Ovidio. The film stars Abigail Breslin as Casey Welson, a teenage girl kidnapped by a mysterious serial killer and Halle Berry as Jordan Turner, a 9-1-1 operator, still suffering emotionally from a prior failed botched 9-1-1 call, who receives Casey's call. Morris Chestnut, Michael Eklund, Michael Imperioli, and David Otunga also star. The story was originally envisioned as a television series, but D'Ovidio later rewrote it as a film. Filming began in July 2012 and spanned a period of 25 days, with all scenes being shot in California, mainly Burbank and Santa Clarita.

A screening of The Call was held at the Women's International Film Festival hosted at the Regal South Beach theater on February 26, 2013. TriStar Pictures released it to theatres on March 15, 2013. Considered to be high-concept by many reviewers, the film proved a commercial success, grossing over $68 million against budget of $13 million. Halle Berry was nominated for Choice Movie Actress in a Drama at the Teen Choice Awards and Best Actress at the BET Awards while Michael Eklund won Best Supporting Performance by a Male in a Motion Picture at the Leo Awards.  Critics gave the film mixed reviews, but praised Berry and Breslin's performances and the film's suspense. It is currently the most successful WWE produced film.

Plot
Seasoned LAPD 9-1-1 operator Jordan Turner receives a call from 15-year-old Leah Templeton, fearing for her life as a man breaks into her home. Calmly advising her to hide, when the call is disconnected, Jordan calls back. The ring gives her location away to the intruder. Jordan attempts to dissuade him, but he responds, "It's already done," and hangs up.

The next day, a television report confirms that Leah has been murdered. Emotionally affected, Jordan decides she can no longer handle field calls.

Six months later, she trains 9-1-1 operators. Teenager Casey Welson is kidnapped from a mall parking garage by a man named Michael, forced into the trunk of a car. Using a disposable phone she calls 9-1-1. Brooke, a rookie operator, receives the call but can't handle it, so Jordan takes over. However, since Casey is using a 'burner' phone, her exact location cannot be determined by GPS.

As Michael drives, Jordan gets Casey to knock out a tail light and signal people nearby. A woman who sees Casey's arm calls 9-1-1 on a phone with GPS, allowing the police to narrow the search, but Michael notices the caller and quickly loses her. When Casey discovers paint in the trunk, Jordan has her pour the paint out of the taillight hole. This attracts the attention of another driver, Alan Denado, but Michael knocks him out with a shovel, and assuming him to be dead, stuffs him into the trunk of his black Lincoln Town Car with Casey.

On the road again, Alan awakens in his trunk, screaming uncontrollably, so Michael pulls over and stabs him to death. When he stops for gas, Casey tries to crawl out of the trunk and scream for help. When the gas attendant tries to open the car door, Michael douses him with gasoline and burns him alive. Meanwhile, the police find Michael's Toyota Camry abandoned in a parking lot, and discover his identity through his fingerprints.

Arriving at their destination, Michael removes Casey from the trunk. He finds the phone in her pocket, connected to 9-1-1. Jordan informs him that his identity, Michael Foster, is uncovered, advising him to surrender and not hurt the girl. Before smashing the phone, Michael responds, "It's already done", making Jordan realize Michael also killed Leah.

Meanwhile, her boyfriend, officer Paul Phillips, and others raid Michael's home, finding only his wife and children. Seeing a photo of Michael and his sister, Melinda, Paul recognizes Casey's resemblance. Additionally, the house in the photo is eventually revealed by Michael's wife to have burned down, although a nearby cottage still remains. The police raid it, but find nobody.

Michael begins to torture Casey slowly, strapping her to a foldable wheelchair, cutting her shirt off to her bra, and forcing her to take nitrous oxide. Determined to rescue her, Jordan drives to the cottage where she finds a number of photos of Michael with his leukemia-stricken sister. Stepping outside, she recognizes sounds from an outdoor flagpole—exactly what she'd heard in the background at the end of the 9-1-1 call. Next to the flagpole, she also finds a trap door where the primary house once stood. Jordan accidentally drops her cell phone down the cellar and climbs down to get it.

Jordan hides from Michael in the cellar. At one glance, his story is clear. He had incestuous feelings towards his sister Melinda and was distraught when she fell ill and died. Michael has a prop head he keeps there which he treats like his sister. He has been scalping and killing young girls who have similar blond hair, trying to find scalps that match his sister's hair, which she lost from chemotherapy.

Jordan soon finds Casey strapped to the wheelchair and attacks Michael as he begins to scalp her. She frees her and they try to escape, during which Casey stabs Michael in the back with scissors. He pursues them and they injure and kick him back down into the cellar, rendering him unconscious. While knocked out, they tie him to a chair. When Michael regains consciousness, the women reveal they intend to leave him there to die. They will claim Casey had escaped and Jordan found her in the woods. People will believe that Michael simply disappeared. He first insults, then pleads, saying they cannot do this to him. Jordan replies with his own words, "It's already done," and locks the door.

Cast

 Halle Berry as Jordan Turner, a 9-1-1 operator
 Abigail Breslin as Casey Welson, a kidnapped teenager
 Morris Chestnut as Officer Paul Phillips, Jordan's boyfriend
 Michael Eklund as Michael Foster, Casey's kidnapper and Leah Templeton's killer
 Michael Imperioli as Alan Denado, Michael's victim
 David Otunga as Officer Jake Devan
 Justina Machado as Rachel
 José Zúñiga as Marco
 Roma Maffia as Maddy
 Evie Thompson as Leah Templeton
 Denise Dowse as Flora
 Ella Rae Peck as Autumn
 Jenna Lamia as Brooke
 Ross Gallo as Josh
 Shawnee Badger as Melinda Foster
 Tara Platt as Female Trainee

Production

Writing and casting

Screenwriter Richard D'Ovidio was inspired to script the story after his wife heard an NPR segment with a 9-1-1 operator discussing her job. He began to research the subject and visited the Los Angeles Metropolitan Communications Dispatch Center (MCDC). Finding the center, which has backup generators, bulletproof windows, and a moat surrounding the building, to be "pretty amazing," he decided to shed light on what he viewed as a previously overlooked occupation. The story was originally conceptualized as a television series titled The Hive (a reference to the constant calls and conversations sounding like bees buzzing), but D'Ovidio decided to redraft it as a film on realizing that "the operators couldn't be the ones kicking in doors and going out into the field" all the time. As a result, what was planned to be the pilot episode was expanded and revised as a movie.

For most of the film, Berry's character, Turner, the 9-1-1 operator, does stay inside "the hive" before becoming actively involved in the search for Breslin's character, Welson, the kidnapped caller. D'Ovidio chose two female leads, explaining, "I wanted strong women... I think it was appropriate here, since most 911 call operators are women." Berry remarked, "I love the idea of being a part of a movie that was so empowering for women. We don't often get to play roles like this, where ordinary people become heroic and do something extraordinary." D'Ovidio chose to tell the story from the perspective of two characters—the operator and the caller—believing that it would become repetitive if it focused on only one. As a result, he switched perspectives every ten pages when writing the screenplay. As well as collaborating on the story with his wife, Nicole and Jon Bokenkamp, he accepted suggestions from Berry, Breslin and Eklund: "Halle came in with some great notes and Abigail and Michael and it started to flesh things out. I'm not one to say 'no' to a great suggested line of dialogue. It just makes me look better as a writer! I feel it's a very collaborative process, and some of the happiest accidents happen when you just listen to people. When someone comes up to you and says, 'Why don't we do it this way?' I think that it's important to listen."

Chestnut, who plays Phillips, a police officer and Turner's boyfriend, prepared by riding along with Los Angeles police officers to observe what it is like to be an officer in a squad car and Berry prepared for the role by visiting a call center and observing the operators at work. She told a Miami Herald interviewer, "You get a different perspective by doing research... You can't know what its like to be a cop even though you've seen it in the movies. But nobody ever saw a 9-1-1 center. I thought they lived in the ground somewhere! It was interesting to see who they were and how they deal and how stressful it can be. I was a wreck watching them. They would just be as cool as can be doing their thing. I thought, 'I could never do this job.'"

Filming
Producers scheduled for The Call to be filmed in Canada in June 2011 after they failed to make the cut for a California tax credit. With a low budget of $13 million, they settled on Ottawa, Ontario, where director Anderson had just finished another project. However, the California Film Commission (CFC) called back nine months later and informed them that the waiting list had been largely cleared and that they now qualified for $1.9 million in tax deduction. According to Producer Michael Helfant, they were "literally days from starting to put down a deposit." Berry was reportedly pleased with the news, wanting to stay in Los Angeles and the CFC helped secure film locations for the project.

With a crew of roughly 120 persons, filming took a total of 25 days, spanning from July to August 2012. Car chase scenes were shot at Long Beach and a Westlake Village office building was modeled as the emergency dispatch center. The latter was also used for the scenes in which Welson is locked in the trunk of a car. Other filming locations include the Burbank Town Center on Magnolia Boulevard in Burbank, California, Santa Clarita, California and the 170 Highway. At one point, Berry was rushed to Cedars-Sinai Medical Center after falling headfirst on concrete while shooting a fight sequence. A spokesperson for Berry confirmed that she suffered a minor head injury and was taken to the hospital as a precaution, but she checked out healthy and was released.

Berry told interviewer Kimberly Grant, "The hard part for me was to try to stay connected to Phillips and Welson." This was because, Grant writes, "she had to spend an entire day reading 21 pages of dialogue, rattling off in quick succession 911-operator jargon, that would be cut and edited to fit the film... In film terms, that means Berry performed for 21 minutes straight with no breaks, not an easy feat for any actor." Though she enjoyed working with Chestnut, Berry told Grant that it was difficult being unable to see her co-stars for most of the film: "That was my constant challenge; to stay on such an emotional level [as Jordan], so that I would be on the same level as they [i.e., Casey and Officer Phillips] were. I used that feeling of frustration and of being stuck to fuel my character."

Music
The score of the film is composed by John Debney. Unlike the other films he composed with an orchestra, the film's score is completely filled with dark and intense electronic and synthesized elements although he used little orchestral elements in the score.

Promotion and release

Sony Pictures Worldwide Acquisitions paid very little money to acquire U.S. distribution rights. But the film screened for a test audience in November 2012 and scores were even higher than anticipated, prompting Sony to give the film a wide theatrical release.

Spanning 94 minutes upon completion, the movie received an R rating for violence, disturbing content and some language. Berry and Chestnut promoted the film at the ShowPlace ICON movie theater at the red-carpet premiere in Chicago on February 28. Berry also traveled to Rio to promote The Call in anticipation of its April 12 release in Brazil.

The Women's International Film Festival hosted a screening of The Call at the Regal South Beach theater on February 26, 2013. Chestnut told the audience that he would sign on for a sequel, saying about Berry, "I didn't get to kiss this woman enough!" Berry added, "I'm in the movie and even I was scared." The film was released in theatres on March 15 and on DVD and Blu-ray Disc on June 25 of that same year. DVD extras included a featurette entitled "Emergency Procedure: Making the Film" and commentary from Abigail Breslin, Halle Berry, and other filmmakers. The Blu-ray version came with more features, including deleted scenes, an alternate ending, Michael Eklund's audition tape, featurettes entitled "A Set Tour of The Hive and The Lair" and "Inside the Stunts", as well as all of the original DVD content.

Reception

Box office

According to Boxoffice, The Call was expected to earn about $11–12 million on its opening weekend in 2,507 theaters across the United States but surpassed this by a significant margin and grossed $17 million in its first three days. This indicated good profits, as the film cost about $13 million to produce and Sony paid a much smaller amount to acquire U.S. distribution rights. With box office takings of over $68 million, The Call is WWE Studios' most commercially successful film to date, the previous top-grossing productions being See No Evil, which stars professional wrestler Kane (Glenn Jacobs) ($19 million) and 12 Rounds, which stars professional wrestler John Cena ($17 million).

Critics were surprised by the movie's box office success because "Berry hadn't had a hit in a number of years" and because the R rating narrowed down the audience. WWE Studios head Michael Luisi commented that The Call "[exceeded] our most optimistic forecasts."

Critical response
On review aggregator Rotten Tomatoes, the film has an approval rating of 44% based on 133 reviews, with an average rating of 5.2/10. The site's critical consensus reads, "The Call builds plenty of suspense before taking a problematic turn in the third act." On Metacritic, another film review aggregator, the film has a weighted average score of 51 out of 100, based on 23 critics, indicating "mixed or average reviews". Audiences polled by CinemaScore gave the film an average grade of "B+" on an A+ to F scale.

Entertainment Weekly gave the film a B rating, saying that the tale "is surprisingly good and surprisingly gruesome fun. Eklund makes the most of the maniac role and Breslin is a sympathetic victim." Reviewer Dwight Brown wrote, "The script gives Berry a blue-collar character she can make accessible, vulnerable and gutsy... Chestnut is suitably gallant and stalwart as her caring lover and a cop on a mission... This film is a whole lot scarier than you think it's going to be." Manohla Dargis of The New York Times wrote, "An effectively creepy thriller about a 911 operator and a young miss in peril, The Call is a model of low-budget filmmaking." She praised its "clean, clever premise" and said that Berry's Jordan is "an old-fashioned hero in many respects, so it's fitting that Mr. Anderson uses old-fashioned filmmaking techniques, like crosscutting, to build tension and old-school exploitation tricks like evil to justify taking the story dark and then dark and bonkers."

A reviewer for The Hutchinson News, Jake Coyle, commented, "Director Brad Anderson... working from the simple, high-concept screenplay by Richard D'Ovidio, ably cuts between Berry's increasingly emotionally-attached Jordan Turner and Breslin's panicking Casey Welson, contrasting the fraught strategizing of Turner with the frantic police pursuit of the kidnapper." Coyle stated that "The Call dials up a shallow thrill ride, but one efficiently peppered with your typical 'don't go in there!' moments," but concluded, "The Call is a rudimentary, almost old-fashioned 90-minute escape that manages to achieve its low ambitions." Rating the film 2 stars out of 4, Coyle writes that once the film "manages to build some suspense from the trunk of the car-- the clever attempts to elicit help, the dwindling cell phone battery-- its deficiencies become less forgivable once the action turns off the road."

Roger Moore of The Seattle Times showed mixed feelings in his review: "Rare is the thriller that goes as completely and utterly wrong as The Call does at almost precisely the one-hour mark. Which is a crying shame, because for an hour this is a riveting, by-the-book kidnapping." Moore explained what he saw as the highs and lows: "Brad Anderson turns this...serial-killer hunt...into a real edge-of-your-seat thriller. Given...a half-decent tale of horror, guilt, problem-solving and redemption, Anderson couldn't go far wrong," but, Moore states, "It's only when our Oscar-winning heroine puts down the phone and sets out to do some sleuthing of her own that The Call disconnects, turning into something far more generic and far less exciting." The Los Angeles Times turned in a similar review: "The semi-fresh thriller, set mainly in an emergency call center and on the freeways of Los Angeles, puts a tech slant on a damsel-in-distress setup. It buzzes along for a while, the promising plot innovations inviting suspension of disbelief, before by-the-numbers implausibility, over-the-top valor and unsavory contrivances take over and the line goes dead."

Accolades
Berry was nominated for two awards for her role as Turner in The Call in 2013. She was nominated for Best Actress for the BET Awards, which were created by the Black Entertainment Television network to celebrate African Americans and other minorities in music, acting, sports and other fields of entertainment over the past year, Berry lost to Kerry Washington for the role in Django Unchained. She was also nominated for Choice Movie Actress in a Drama at the Teen Choice Awards, but lost to Emma Watson for The Perks of Being a Wallflower.

The film was also nominated for Best Thriller Film at the 40th Saturn Awards and Berry was nominated for Saturn Award for Best Actress, but lost to World War Z and Sandra Bullock, respectively.

2022 Resurgence
On April 10, 2022, close to a decade after its theatrical release, the film was added to the streaming platform, Netflix. By April 11, 2022, it was the most popular film on the platform. The film surged to #1 on Netflix and on April 13, 2022, both Halle Berry and Michael Eklund addressed its resurgence with fans on social media. Berry jokingly tweeted to fans asking"Are y'all Ok?" while Eklund tweeted that he was "glad you all still enjoy it".

See also
List of films featuring home invasions

References

External links

2013 films
2013 thriller films
2013 crime thriller films
2013 psychological thriller films
2010s serial killer films
American crime thriller films
American films about revenge
American psychological thriller films
American serial killer films
Emergency communication
2010s English-language films
Fictional portrayals of the Los Angeles Police Department
Films about child abduction in the United States
Films directed by Brad Anderson
Films scored by John Debney
Films set in 2012
Films set in Los Angeles
Films shot in Los Angeles
Incest in film
Stage 6 Films films
TriStar Pictures films
WWE Studios films
2010s American films